The Trenitalia ETR 700, originally NS Hispeed V250,  is a high-speed train designed by Pininfarina and built by AnsaldoBreda originally for NS International and NMBS/SNCB to operate on the Fyra-service, a high speed train between Amsterdam and Brussels with a branch to Breda on the newly built HSL-Zuid in the Netherlands and its extension HSL 4 in Belgium.

V250s were delivered with a significant delay. Full commercial services with V250 started on 9 December 2012 but stopped only 39 days later on 17 January 2013, after the Belgian Railway Inspection Agency had suspended the operating license. This happened because of safety and structural problems with the construction and maintenance of V250. All were removed from service and sent back to AnsaldoBreda in Italy.

In August 2017, Trenitalia purchased all 19 V250 sets to expand its high speed fleet and rebranded them as ETR700s. After being refurbished, they entered service on Frecciargento services, on the Adriatic railway, between Milan and Lecce in 2019. Seventeen sets will be used for services, with the remaining two used as sources of spares.

Background and history
NS International and NMBS/SNCB ordered 19 sets in 2004 for operations between Amsterdam and Brussels and Breda on the HSL-Zuid and HSL 4 high speed railway lines.
Initially delivery was foreseen for 2007. 
In 2008 expectations were for deliveries by 2009 and an introduction into service by the middle of 2009.

The first sets had been manufactured by March 2009, and initial tests on the Velim test circuit in the Czech Republic took place in early 2009, In April 2009 the first unit arrived in Arnhem in the Netherlands, and was towed to Amsterdam for tests.

The NS International had claimed that the delay of introduction of any trains was due to the lack of a formal ETCS level 2 specification; by March HSA was close to financial ruin due to lack of any income, and a re-organisation of track access charges for the unused HSL-Zuid line had to be arranged with the Dutch government.

The service, branded Fyra, was introduced along with the formal presentation of the prototype V250 train at the high speed train depot at Watergraafsmeer in the Netherlands on 7 July 2009. The unfurnished prototype underwent testing on both high speed lines, with the ordered trains' expected in-service date of Autumn 2010; introduction of any service on the HSL-Zuid had been delayed due to problems with the introduction of the ETCS signalling system; the line had been built without any legacy safety system. Services on the line began in September 2009 with conventional locomotive haulage, but the introduction of level 2 ETCS on the whole line was not in place, and expected by June 2010.

In 2010, the Dutch transport minister Camiel Eurlings stated that any introduction of a commercial V250 service on Dutch high speed lines would not take place until December 2011. Driver training on high-speed lines in the Netherlands began in March 2012, with commercial use of the V250 planned for September 2012.

A limited service of one return train per 3 hours in the Netherlands began in September 2012 between Amsterdam and Rotterdam.

The trains were provisionally certified for use in Belgium in September 2012.

Regular Fyra service between Amsterdam and Brussels with V250 trains began on 9 December 2012.

Following their introduction, the V250 trains experienced numerous technical problems. All V250s were suspended from commercial service on 16 January 2013, after only one month of service, due to reliability and safety concerns in snowy weather. Two days later the certification for the V250 in Belgium was revoked after a floor plate that had fallen off a V250 was found along the tracks.

The continuous problems with the V250 trains caused a public outcry in both Belgium and the Netherlands, including accusations in the Belgian and Dutch media that only financial considerations were behind the decision to grant the contract to AnsaldoBreda. Initially, the maximum speed requirements were fixed at 220 km/h, which would have reduced the purchase cost per seat drastically. However, after comparing offers by Alstom (manufacturers of French TGV trains) and Siemens (who manufacture the German ICE trains) with that of AnsaldoBreda, it transpired that the Italian producer was able to offer a cheaper train with a higher speed of 250 km/h, which ultimately gave the Italian company the edge.

On 31 May 2013, the Belgian railway company NMBS/SNCB decided to stop the Fyra project, due to the many technical issues, and safety concerns. No trains had been delivered and the company refused delivery of the trains it had ordered, on grounds that the manufacturer was unable to resolve any of the numerous issues in the contractually foreseen 3 months.

On 3 June 2013, the Dutch national railway company NS announced that it had made a similar evaluation, and expressed its desire to stop with the V250 project. The Dutch department of finance agreed, and recommended that NS do "everything in its power" to get a refund from AnsaldoBreda. At a press conference on 6 June 2013, the manufacturer claimed that the trains had been handled poorly by running the trains too fast (i.e. at maximum commercial speed of 250 km/h) under snow conditions. AnsaldoBreda has also threatened to sue the railways for the damage to its reputation.

On 17 March 2014, NS announced a settlement with AnsaldoBreda had been reached. The 9 NS trains would be returned to AnsaldoBreda for a refund of €125 million, €88m less than originally paid. NS would receive an additional compensation for each resold unit to a maximum of €21m, although no units have been sold by the NS.

Similarly, in May 2014 NMBS/SNCB, AnsaldoBreda and its controlling company Finmeccanica announced that they reached a settlement that confirms the cancellation of the train orders and included a payment of €2.5m to NMBS/SNCB.

In August 2017, Trenitalia purchased all 19 V250 sets to expand its high speed fleet and rebranded them as ETR700s. Seventeen sets will be used for services, with the remaining two used as sources of spares. Testing began in February 2019. The first four entered on 9 June 2019 on Frecciargento services on the Adriatic railway between Milan and Ancona with all to be in service by early 2020 with services extended to Lecce.

Design
The 8-car sets are designed to operate on 3 kV DC, 1.5 kV DC and 25 kV 50 Hz AC overhead power supply, allowing operations on both Dutch and Belgian electrified networks. Traction is distributed with alternating powered and trailer vehicles in MTMTTMTM formation. Electric traction power is controlled by water-cooled IGBT inverters powering asynchronous motors. They are fitted with ETCS Level 2 and local train safety systems.

The carbodies are constructed of aluminium, except the driving cab which is of steel. Three of the coaches are used for first class accommodation, giving 127 first class seats out of a total seated capacity of 546. First class seating is in [2+1] formation, second in [2+2] formation. The design company Pininfarina also contributed to the design.

Interior

Notes

References

External links

Images

Video
 Videos of V250 being towed to the Netherlands for testing

AnsaldoBreda multiple units
Electric multiple units of the Netherlands
Ferrovie dello Stato Italiane electric railcars and multiple units
High-speed rail in Italy
High-speed trains of the Netherlands
Passenger trains running at least at 250 km/h in commercial operations
Train-related introductions in 2012
3000 V DC multiple units
25 kV AC multiple units
1500 V DC multiple units of the Netherlands